What Men Talk About (Russian: О чём говорят мужчины) is a 2010 Russian comedy written and directed by Dmitriy Dyachenko, filmed in the genre of road movie based on the Russian play Conversations middle-aged men have about women, movies and aluminum forks with the participation of the actors of the comic theatre "Quartet E". What Men Talk About is the third film adaptation of the theatre "Quartet". After a successful theatrical release, What Men Still Talk About was announced. In April 2010, the film began licensing issued on DVD by The Mystery of Sound.

Plot
What Men Talk About? Of course, women. But also about work, money, cars, football ... but in general about women. And if they have two days when they escape from their offices and families, to get away from all the cares and commitments – two days, eventful and adventurous – you can be sure that this time they will have time to discuss a lot of things ... And More. From these conversations – we know for sure – many women learn about themselves a lot of new things. 
Four friends are going to go to Odessa for the concert of a famous Russian band Bi-2. Two of them, Alexey and Sasha, have problems in the morning: one can not deal with things around the house, the other – cannot get rid of the annoying customers at work. When, finally, they join their other friends who already left, Camille and Slava, they begin to talk about all sorts of things. Thus, the first day on the road passes. They spend the night in a hotel village ‘Beldyazhki’. 
The next day, the heroes continue to talk about life, passing through Kyiv, where they buy paintings by Tishchenko and at the same time discussing modern art. By the end of the movie 4 men get into a car accident, but still make it in time for the concert. 
"What Men Talk About" – this is the third, and by far, the best film of the cult theater "Quartet". Four middle-aged friends receive an invitation from their friend in Odessa to come to him for his birthday, and at the same time attend a concert of a famous Russian group "B-2". Each of them, like all of us, has a difficulty with time. One has work, the second – has his wife and children, the third – has both work and family, but still, with great a difficulty, they manage to escape for a few days. They sit in the car and go to the long journey. On the road, they have many adventures, many of which can knock a person out of a rut. But when you have people next to you with whom you can talk about everything, all the hardships of life become insignificant ... And real men are known to have a lot of different topics for discussion. Work, parties, money, music, clubs, and of course – women. If a man is still single, he is concerned about the issue – whether to get married. And married ones concern whether they can cheat on their wife.

Cast

Leonid Baratz – Lyosha
Aleksandr Demidov – Sasha
Kamil Larin – Kamil
Rostislav Khait  – Slava
Nonna Grishayeva – Slava's imaginary wife
Yelena Podkaminskaya – Nastya, Lyosha's wife
Veronica Amirkhanova – Lisa, Lyosha's eldest daughter
Valeria Usable – Eva, Lyosha's youngest daughter
Natalia Sigova – Grandma 1
Valentina Zubchenko – Grandma 2
Maria Bondarenko – Grandma 3
Maksim Vitorgan – Romeo
Yulia Pyznar – Juliet
Fyodor Dobronravov – a man who is in love with a sausage
Sergei Nikonenko – the captain of the ship
Maksim Nikitin – captain's assistant
 Nina Ruslanova –  hotel administrator
 Jeanna Friske, Andrey Makarevich, Oleg Menshikov, Vasily Utkin,  Bi-2 – cameo

Music
The soundtrack to What men talk about

Release
The Russian premiere took place on March 4, 2010. During the first, the film collected 109 million rubles, thus becoming one of the leaders of the domestic box office. Total film has collected 679.5 million rubbles.

Reception 

Reception of What Men Talk About by Russian film critics was overwhelmingly positive, it received no negative reviews and rated 8.9/10 on average.

Julia Ioffe of Slate wrote that film illustrates attitudes about sexual liberation for men in Moscow.

References

External links 
 
 Официальный сайт фильма 

2010 films
2010 comedy films
2010s Russian-language films
Ukrainian-language films
2010s comedy road movies
Films set in Kyiv
Films set in Odesa
Films shot in Kyiv
Films shot in Moscow
Films shot in Odesa
Russian comedy road movies